Xerotyphlops vermicularis, the European blind snake, European worm snake, Eurasian blind snake, or Eurasian worm snake, is a species of snake in the genus Xerotyphlops.   Despite its common name, the range of the European blind snake ranges from the Balkan Peninsula, the Aegean Islands, and Cyprus to Afghanistan. The common name refers to how it is the only blindsnake of the genus Typhlops naturally found in Europe.  The only other blindsnake found in Europe is the brahminy blindsnake, or "flowerpot snake," Ramphotyphlops braminus, where specimens have been discovered lurking in the soil at the Kew Gardens.

See also
 List of typhlopid species and subspecies

References

External links

vermicularis
Reptiles described in 1820

Snakes of Jordan